The Best of N2Deep is the first greatest hits compilation and eighth album overall by rap group, N2Deep.  The compilation was released in 1999 for Soul Town Records and was produced by N2Deep, Johnny Z and others. In 2002 the project was remastered and reissued with the same track listing on Jay Tee's own label 40 Ounce Records. The remastering was done by Larry Funk.

Track listing

References

External links 
 The Best of 1999 release at Musicbrainz
 The Best of 2002 reissue at Musicbrainz

N2Deep albums
Jay Tee albums
1999 greatest hits albums
Hip hop compilation albums